The Beary are an ethnic group of South India.

Beary may also refer to:
 Beary language, the Dravidian language spoken by the Beary
 Beary, a surname. Notable people with this name include:
 Donald B. Beary (1888–1966), US Navy officer
 Kevin Beary (born 1957), Sheriff of Orange County, Florida, US
 Michael Beary (born 1956), Irish army officer

See also 
 The Beary Family, a cartoon series
 Bearys Institute of Technology in Mangalore, India
 USS Donald B. Beary (FF-1085), US Navy ship

Language and nationality disambiguation pages